Tabassum is a given name and surname. Notable people with the name include:

Given name
Tabassum Adnan (born 1977), Pakistani women's rights activist
Tabassum Akhlaq (born 1964), Pakistani writer
Begum Tabassum Hasan (born 1970), Indian politician
Tabassum Hashmi or Tabu (born 1971), Indian actress
Tabassum Ferdous Shaon (born 1979), Bangladeshi model

Surname
Azad Ali Tabassum (born 1968), Pakistani politician
Ghulam Mustafa Tabassum (1899–1978), Pakistani poet
Marina Tabassum (born 1968/1969), Bangladeshi architect
Rukshana Tabassum  (born 1985), Indian actress
Shukria Tabassum (2006–2015), Afghan child murder victim
Wajida Tabassum (1935–2011), Indian writer
Zakia Tabassum, Bangladeshi politician

See also
Tabassum (1944–2022), Indian actress and talk show host